The Chin National Front (CNF) is a Chin nationalist political organization in Myanmar. According to its website, its armed wing, the Chin National Army (CNA), fights the government of Myanmar. The group was founded on 20 March 1988. This organization claims to seek a Federal Union based on self-determination, ethnic equality and democracy. The Chin people are one of the four founding members (Chin, Kachin, Shan, and Bamar) of the Union of Burma. In 2021, CNF became a member of the National Unity Consultative Council.

History 
The group was founded by the Chin people on 20 March 1988, following unsuccessful attempts at armed resistance. The founders were Pu Tial Khal, Pu Lian No Thang (L) and Pu Roenga (L) at Tatkawng Veng, India on February 20 1988. Pu Tial Khal was President. Pu No Than Kap was directed to join the National Democratic Front (NDF) to KNU headquarters soon after it was founded. Pu No Than Kap became CNF President until he was forcefully expelled.

Central Executive Committee members
The Central Executive Committee members of the Seventh Party Conference (2020-2024) of the Chin National Front are:

 Pu Zing Cung, Chairman
 Pu Thang Ning Kee, Vice Chairman One
 Dr. Salai Lian Hmung Sakhong, Vice Chairman Two
 Dr. Sui Khar, Vice Chairman Three
 Salai Thla Hei, General Secretary
 Salai Ram Kulh Cung, Assistant General Secretary One
 Salai Htet Ni, Assistant General Secretary Two
 Pu HC Ral Hnin, Assistant General Secretary Three
 Col. Solomon, Member
 Pu Rokhawma, Member
 Salai Bawi Lian Mang, Member
 Salai Biak Pum, Member
Pi Leng Kee Ling, Member
 Pu Bil Cung, Member
 Col. Hla Thun, Member

Ceasefire agreements 
The Chin National Front signed a state level preliminary "Ceasefire Agreement" with the Chin State government on January 6, 2012, the first Union level ceasefire agreement with Union level peace negotiation team on May 7, 2012. A second Union level "Ceasefire Agreement" with the Union Peacemaking Work Committee came on December 9, 2012.

Platform
The Chin National Front stated that they are not based on a class of people, a religious belief, a region or an ideology but works for the Chin people. The Chin National Front welcomes and invites any nation, state, organization, and individuals to join in the effort to restore democracy, freedom and federalism in the Union of Burma.

Relationships 
CNF

are a member of the National Democratic Front (NDF), composed of non-Burman nationalities/ NDF was formed in 1976 to establish a federal union based on a democratic system supporting equality and self-determination. The Chin National Front is a member and actively implements the NDF's objectives.
are a member of the Democratic Alliance of Burma, which aims to restore democracy, freedom, and establish a federal union. The Democratic Alliance of Burma was formed on November 14, 1988 by 18 democratic forces.
are a member of the National Council of the Union of Burma (NCUB). The NCUB is an alliance of the National Democratic Front, Democratic Alliance of Burma, National Coalition Government of the Union of Burma, and National League for Democracy (Liberated Area). It was formed in 1992 to restore democracy, freedom, and establish federal union. NUCB is a member of Council of Asian Liberals.
are a member of the Unrepresented Nations and Peoples Organization (UNPO), a democratic, international membership organization. Its members are indigenous peoples, occupied nations, minorities and independent states or territories who have joined to protect their human and cultural rights, preserve their environments, and to find non-violent solutions to conflicts that affect them. UNPO provides an established forum for member aspirations and assists its members in effective participation.
became a signatory of the Geneva Call by signing a Deed of Commitment on July 31, 2006. Geneva Call is an international humanitarian organization dedicated to engaging armed non-state actors in mine-ban action. It provides a complementary mechanism to the Convention on anti-personnel mines, including the Ottawa Convention.

The Chin National Army is the military wing of the Chin National Front. It strictly applies the modified Geneva Military Code of Conduct and other international military norms and codes. CNA provides security for the Chin National Front.

See also
Internal conflict in Myanmar
List of rebel groups in Myanmar
Zogam

References

Rebel groups in Myanmar
Politics of Myanmar